William Porter Durkee (born  1983) is a professional poker player. He was a graduate student at the Northwestern University in Chicago, Illinois. He graduated from the University of Virginia in 2005 with a B.A. in economics. He graduated with "Honorable Mention All-American" honors in wrestling and "Academic All-American."

In 2007, he won a World Series of Poker bracelet in the $2,000 No-Limit Hold'em event, Later that year, Durkee finished 13th in the World Series of Poker Europe Main Event, earning £38,010 ($76,542).

As of 2008, Durkee has earned over $750,000 in live tournament play. His seven cashes at the WSOP account for $715,422 of those winnings.

World Series of Poker bracelets

References

Year of birth missing (living people)
Living people
People from Pittsburgh
University of Virginia alumni
American poker players
World Series of Poker bracelet winners